Inge Druckrey (born 1940 in Germany) is a designer and educator, who brought the Swiss school of design to the United States. She taught at Yale University, Rhode Island School of Design, University of Hartford, Philadelphia College of Art, Kunstgewerbeschule in Krefeld, The University of the Arts, Kansas City Art Institute. She is Professor Emerita of Graphic Design, University of the Arts.

Biography
Druckrey received her state diploma in Graphic Design from the Kunstgewerbeschule Basel, Switzerland in 1965. Her education included studies in art history and languages at the University of Basel. From 1965 – 1966 she was a designer at the Agency Halpern in Zürich, Switzerland. She is married to political scientist and theorist of information design Edward Tufte.

Work
In 1966–1968, Druckrey taught at the Kansas City Art Institute, 1968–1970 at the Werkkunstschule in Krefeld, Germany, 1971–1973 at Philadelphia College of Art, 1973–1995 at Yale School of Art, 1984-1985 (part-time) at University of Hartford, 1987-1994 (as Visiting Critic) at Rhode Island School of Design, 1994-2010 University of the Arts. In 2007 Inge Druckrey was awarded the Mary Louise Beitzel Award for Distinguished Teaching.

Druckrey has done free-lance work for European and American clients including Scholastic Inc., the Schoenberg Institute, IBM, New Jersey Transit, the University of Hartford, the Council on Resident Education in Obstetrics and Gynecology, the University of Pennsylvania, Yale University, and the Porcelain Manufactory Fuerstenberg, Germany. Her work has been published in Graphis, Industrial Design, Design Quarterly, The 20th Century Poster, The Thames & Hudson Encyclopedia of Graphic Design and Designers, Graphic Design-World Views (Icograda), and is included in the permanent collection at the Museum of Modern Art, Cooper-Hewitt, National Design Museum and Museum für Gestaltung.

In 2012 Andrei Severny made a documentary film about Druckrey's work called Teaching to See. The film was produced by Edward Tufte.

Publications
Inge Druckrey,“Learning from Historical Sources,” Spirals 91, (Graphic Design Department, Rhode Island School of Design, Fall 1992), 121–128.
H.U. Allemann, Inge Druckrey, Basic Design, Limited Edition Publication, (Kansas City Art Institute, 1968) 
Inge Druckrey,“Signs,” Design Quarterly 92, (Walker Art Center, Minneapolis, Minnesota, 1974)

Exhibitions
30 Years of Poster Art, Gewerbemuseum Basel, Switzerland, 1983.
The 20th Century Poster, Design of the Avant-Garde, Walker Art Center, Minneapolis, 1985.
The Basel School of Design and its Philosophy: The Armin Hofmann Years, Moore College of Art and Design, Rhode Island School of Design, Virginia Commonwealth University, 1986.
The Modern Poster, The Museum of Modern Art, New York, 1988.
Universal/Unique, 31 Graphic Design Educators, the University of the Arts (Philadelphia), the Herb Lubalin Study Center, Cooper-Hewitt, National Design Museum, New York, 1989.
Graphic Design in America, Walker Art Center, IBM Gallery of Science and Art, The Phoenix Art Museum, Design Museum at Butlers Wharf in London, 1989.
UArts Faculty Work, Rosenwald-Wolf and Hamilton Galleries, The University of the Arts (Philadelphia), 2001.

References

External links

Review of documentary Teaching to See at Lifehacker
Inge Druckrey interview on documentary Teaching to See at RÚV, The Icelandic National Broadcasting Service
Teaching to See featured by Grafill - Norwegian Organisation for Visual Communication
MBL.is article "What's the Secret to creativity?" 
Inge Druckrey to speak at DesignTalks (March 14, 2013) organized by Island Design Center
2005 AIGA Design Educators Conference article Schools Of Thoughts 2 which includes Inge Druckrey

Living people
German graphic designers
Yale School of Art faculty
1940 births
Design educators
Artists from Berlin
Women graphic designers
20th-century German artists
20th-century German women artists
21st-century German artists
21st-century German women artists
University of the Arts (Philadelphia) faculty
German emigrants to the United States
Rhode Island School of Design faculty